Blue Heart is an independent sci-fi Cuban film directed by Miguel Coyula, and starring Lynn Cruz, Carlos Gronlier and Héctor Noas. The film had its world premiere at the 2021 Moscow International Film Festival. It had a successful festival run in events like BAFICI, and the Guadalajara Film Festival, among others.

Plot 
The film's plot takes place in a uchronia, serving as a connected, if nor a direct sequel to Coyula's 2003 debut film Red Cockroaches. In this alternative reality, Fidel Castro shepherds a program to create the New Man (utopian concept) with genetic engineering, and save the Cuban revolution. The experiment fails, with the resulting individuals being highly dangerous and unstable. They form a terrorist group, and threaten to destroy the very core of the society which created them. One of them, Elena, begins a journey in search of her origins.

Awards and nominations 
 Jorge Cámara HFPA Award  - Guadalajara, Festival Internacional México, 2021
 Nominated to the Golden St. George - Moscow International Film Festival, Russia, 2021

Production 
The film was filmed clandestine in chronological order over a decade. During this time several actors abandoned the project, most notably Héctor Noas, which forced constant rewrites of the screenplay. Another relevant event was the interrogation of photographer Javier Caso, brother of Ana de Armas. Caso took still pictures on set of Corazón Azul before he was summoned by the Cuban State security for an interview questioning his friendship with director Miguel Coyula and Lynn Cruz, who were both described by the agents as troublemakers and possible CIA employees. Caso recorded the audio with a hidden cellphone.

Controversy 
Blue Heart was censored at the Minsk International Film Festival in Minsk, Belarus. It was withdrawn from the main competition and placed in the Cinema of the Young section, despite the director being 44 years old, and Corazón Azul being his fourth feature.

Something similar happened in Morocco at the International Cinema and commom Memory Festival in Nador (FICMEC). The festival staff removed the film from its program a few days before the festival started. Both in Belarus and Morocco, the film was catalogued as pornography and Coyula was asked to cut two of scenes, which he refused. 

In 2023, the Miami International Film Festival programmed a wide selection of Cuban films and excluded Blue Heart. Film critic Pablo Gamba wrote of this event: "Miguel Coyula has become the beacon for political discomfort. It’s an honor he owes not only to the cultural bureaucrats and the and police of Cuba, where he lives, but it has also become extensive to Miami."

Critical reception 
In Cinéaste, film critic Matthew David Roe referred to Blue Heart as: "The culminating point of Miguel Coyula´s artistic growth... It stands as his most visceral experience". The Film Veredict’s Patricia Boero wrote "A complex, criptic, compelling film... It lingers in the mind as you continue to decipher its codes long after the screening has ended".  Pablo Gamba described it at Los Experimentos as "emblematic of contemporary Cuban culture."

See also 
Cinema of Cuba

References 

2021 films
Cuban films
2021 independent films
2021 science fiction films